The 1999–2000 Buffalo Sabres season was the 30th for the National Hockey League (NHL) franchise that was established on May 22, 1970. The season saw the Sabres qualify for the 2000 Stanley Cup playoffs, but lose in the first round to the Philadelphia Flyers.

Off-season

Regular season
The Sabres struggled on the power-play, scoring only 37 power-play goals (tied for 28th with Phoenix Coyotes) and finishing 28th in power-play percentage (10.54%).

Final standings

Schedule and results

Playoffs
2000 Stanley Cup playoffs
The Sabres lost the Conference Quarterfinals (4–1) versus the Philadelphia Flyers.

(1) Philadelphia Flyers vs. (8) Buffalo Sabres

Player statistics

Regular season
Scoring

Goaltending

Playoffs
Scoring

Goaltending

Awards and records

Transactions

Draft picks
Buffalo's draft picks at the 1999 NHL Entry Draft held at the FleetCenter in Boston, Massachusetts.

See also
 1999–2000 NHL season

References

Buff
Buff
Buffalo Sabres seasons
Buffalo
Buffalo